Anthony Jonathan Murley (born 7 August 1957) is an English former first-class cricketer.

Murley was born at Radlett in August 1957. He was educated at Oundle School, before going up to St Catharine's College, Cambridge. While studying at Cambridge, he played first-class cricket for Cambridge University Cricket Club in 1981, making six appearances. Playing as an opening batsman alongside Peter Mills in five of these matches, he scored 152 runs at an average of 13.81 and a highest score of 48.

References

External links

1957 births
Living people
People from Radlett
Alumni of St Catharine's College, Cambridge
English cricketers
Cambridge University cricketers